Golujeh-ye Hasan Beyg (also Romanized as Golūjeh-ye Ḩasan Beyg) is a village in Almalu Rural District, Nazarkahrizi District, Hashtrud County, East Azerbaijan Province, Iran. At the 2006 census, its population was 277, in 40 families.

References 

Towns and villages in Hashtrud County